Robert M. Salter Jr. was an American engineer who worked for the RAND Corporation.  He was one of the first to study the possibility of using a satellite to collect information. During the 1970s, he advocated the vactrain high-speed transit concept.  He also published papers on energy storage for the space program.

Salter died in May 2011.

See also 
Preliminary Design of an Experimental World-Circling Spaceship

References 

American engineers
2011 deaths
Presidents of the American Society of Agronomy